The 2021 UEFA Europa League Final was the final match of the 2020–21 UEFA Europa League, the 50th season of Europe's secondary club football tournament organised by UEFA, and the 12th season since it was renamed from the UEFA Cup to the UEFA Europa League. It was played on 26 May 2021 at the Stadion Gdańsk in Gdańsk, Poland, between Spanish club Villarreal and English club Manchester United.

The final was originally scheduled to be played at the Ramón Sánchez Pizjuán Stadium in Seville, Spain. However, due to the postponement and relocation of the 2020 final to Cologne, the final hosts were shifted back a year, with Gdańsk instead hosting the 2021 final, as a result of the COVID-19 pandemic in Europe.

Villarreal won the match 11–10 on penalties following a 1–1 draw after extra time, thus winning its first trophy in the competition. As winners, Villarreal earned the right to play against the winners of the 2020–21 UEFA Champions League, Chelsea, in the 2021 UEFA Super Cup. They also qualified for the group stage of the 2021–22 UEFA Champions League.

Teams
In the following table, finals until 2009 were in the UEFA Cup era, since 2010 were in the UEFA Europa League era.

Venue

The match was played at the Stadion Gdańsk in Gdańsk, Poland. At the meeting of the UEFA Executive Committee in Kyiv in May 2018, the stadium was initially selected to host the 2020 UEFA Europa League Final, but when the COVID-19 pandemic forced UEFA to move the latter stages of the 2019–20 competition to Germany, the UEFA Executive Committee delayed Stadion Gdańsk's hosting of the Europa League final to 2021. The original venues for the 2021 and 2022 finals were also delayed by a year.

This was the first UEFA club match hosted at the stadium, which was one of the venues for UEFA Euro 2012. It was the second UEFA club competition final to be played in Poland, as the 2015 UEFA Europa League Final was played at the National Stadium in Warsaw. When the stadium was selected to host the 2020 final, it was known as Stadion Energa Gdańsk, so due to UEFA sponsorship regulations, marketing materials for the match referred to the venue as Gdańsk Stadium. Although the sponsorship deal with Energa was ended in November 2020, the stadium continued to be known as Gdańsk Stadium for the final.

Host selection

An open bidding process was launched on 22 September 2017 by UEFA to select the venues of the finals of the UEFA Champions League, UEFA Europa League, and UEFA Women's Champions League in 2020. Associations had until 31 October 2017 to express interest, and bid dossiers had to be submitted by 1 March 2018. Associations hosting matches at UEFA Euro 2020 were not allowed to bid for the 2020 UEFA Europa League final.

UEFA announced on 3 November 2017 that two associations had expressed interest in hosting the 2020 UEFA Europa League final.

The Stadion Gdańsk in Gdańsk was selected by the UEFA Executive Committee during their meeting in Kyiv on 24 May 2018.

On 17 June 2020, the UEFA Executive Committee announced that due to the postponement and relocation of the 2020 final, Gdańsk would instead host the 2021 final.

Background
This was Villarreal's fourth ever final in an official knockout tournament, having played previously three in UEFA competitions, all in the UEFA Intertoto Cup, winning it in 2003 and 2004. On the other hand, this was head coach Unai Emery's fifth European final, all in the UEFA Europa League; he won three successive titles with Sevilla in 2014, 2015 and 2016, before losing in 2019 with Arsenal.

This was Manchester United's second UEFA Cup/Europa League final, having won the only previous occasion in 2017. Overall, it was their eighth European major final between the European Cup/Champions League, Cup Winners' Cup, and the UEFA Cup/Europa League. Ole Gunnar Solskjær reached his first final as the club's manager, having scored the winning goal in the 1999 UEFA Champions League Final playing for them, exactly 22 years prior.

The clubs previously met four times, in the 2005–06 and 2008–09 UEFA Champions League group stages. All games ended in goalless draws.

Road to the final

Note: In all results below, the score of the finalist is given first (H: home; A: away).

Notes

Pre-match

Officials
On 12 May 2021, UEFA named Frenchman Clément Turpin as the referee for the final. Turpin had been a FIFA referee since 2010, and was previously the fourth official in the 2018 UEFA Champions League Final. He officiated six matches in the 2020–21 Champions League season, and one leg in the 2020–21 Europa League round of 32. He served as a referee at UEFA Euro 2016 in France and the 2018 FIFA World Cup in Russia, and was selected as an official for UEFA Euro 2020. Turpin also was a video assistant referee at the 2017 FIFA Confederations Cup in Russia (including in the final), the 2017 FIFA Club World Cup in the United Arab Emirates and the 2019 FIFA Women's World Cup in France. He was joined by five of his fellow countrymen, with Nicolas Danos and Cyril Gringore as assistant referees, François Letexier as the video assistant referee, and Jérôme Brisard and Benjamin Pagès as two of the assistant VAR officials. Slavko Vinčić of Slovenia was the fourth official, while Dutchman Pol van Boekel served as the remaining assistant VAR.

Match

Summary
Villarreal opened the scoring in the 29th minute with a goal from Gerard Moreno, diverting the ball into the net with his right leg from six yards out after a free-kick from the left side delivered by Dani Parejo. Edinson Cavani equalized in the 55th minute after a shot by Marcus Rashford from 20 yards deflected off of Scott McTominay to Cavani, who scored with a low shot from five yards out.
There were no more goals in normal time or in extra time with the match going to a penalty shoot-out. The first ten penalties from both teams were converted, leaving the goalkeepers to take a penalty. Villarreal keeper Gerónimo Rulli converted his penalty, and then saved David de Gea's attempt to his left, winning his side the trophy.

Details
The "home" team (for administrative purposes) was determined by an additional draw to be held after the quarter-final and semi-final draws.

Statistics

See also
2021 UEFA Champions League Final
2021 UEFA Women's Champions League Final
2021 UEFA Super Cup
Manchester United F.C. in international football
Villarreal CF in European football

Notes

References

External links

2020–21 in English football
2020–21 in Polish football
2020–21 in Spanish football
Final
21st century in Gdańsk
Association football penalty shoot-outs
International club association football competitions hosted by Poland
Manchester United F.C. matches
May 2021 sports events in Poland
2021
2021
Villarreal CF matches